Dave Bruylandts (born 12 July 1976 in Lier) is a Belgian former professional road bicycle racer. Bruylandts was tested positive for EPO use in 2004 and was banned for 18 months. Following his ban, Bruylandts briefly rode for Unibet.com in 2006 and for the UCI Continental team Klaipėda-Splendid Cyclingteam in 2007. Bruylandts is married to racing cyclist Femke Melis.

Career achievements

Major results 

1996
 3rd Road race, National Under-23 Road Championships
1997
 2nd Vlaamse Havenpijl
 1998
 1st Overall Ronde van Antwerpen
 2nd Road race, National Under-23 Road Championships
 1999
 1st Nationale Sluitingsprijs
 1st Leeuwse Pijl
 3rd Grand Prix de Fourmies
 7th Giro dell'Emilia
 8th Grote Prijs Jef Scherens
 2000
 1st  Overall Circuito Montañés
1st Stage 2
1st Stage 5
 1st Schynberg Rundfahrt Sulz
 1st Grote Prijs Jef Scherens
 2nd GP Stad Zottegem
 3rd Overall Vuelta a Castilla y León
1st Stage 3
 3rd A Travers le Morbihan
 4th Overall Circuit Franco-Belge
 4th Circuito de Getxo
 4th Grand Prix de Wallonie
 5th Druivenkoers-Overijse
 5th Grand Prix d'Isbergues
 7th Overall Vuelta a Burgos
 8th GP Rik Van Steenbergen
 8th Rund um Köln
 9th Overall Tour de Luxembourg
 10th Overall Vuelta a Murcia
2001
 1st  Mountains classification Vuelta a Andalucía
 4th De Brabantse Pijl
 2002
 1st Grand Prix de Wallonie
 2nd Grand Prix Pino Cerami
 4th Tour de Berne
 5th Overall Route du Sud
1st Stage 4
 8th De Brabantse Pijl
 2003
 1st Grand Prix de Wallonie
 1st Giro d'Oro
 1st Stage 3 Vuelta a Burgos
 1st Schriek, Derny
 2nd Subida a Urkiola
 2nd GP Industria Artigianato e Commercio Carnaghese
 3rd Overall Tour de Pologne
 3rd Overall Circuit Franco-Belge
 4th De Brabantse Pijl
 4th Nokere-Koerse
 5th Overall Tour of Belgium
1st Stage 5
 5th Overall Grote Prijs Erik Breukink
 10th Tour of Flanders
 2004
 3rd Tour of Flanders
 3rd Overall Tour de Langkawi
 4th Dwars door Vlaanderen
 4th Grand Prix Pino Cerami
 2007
 1st Zuidkempense Pijl
 1st Dwars door het Hageland
 1st Stage 4 Triptyque Ardennaise
 1st Stage 3 Tour de Namur
2008
 2nd Grand Prix Criquielion
 5th De Vlaamse Pijl

Grand Tour general classification results timeline

See also
 List of doping cases in cycling

External links 

Belgian male cyclists
1976 births
Living people
People from Lier, Belgium
Doping cases in cycling
Cyclists from Antwerp Province